UHQCD The First Best Selection '93~'99 is a compilation album by Japanese singer/songwriter Chisato Moritaka, released on November 25, 2015 by zetima. The album compiles a selection of Moritaka's singles from 1993 to 1999 in Ultimate High Quality Compact Disc (UHQCD) format. It was released simultaneously with Warner Music Japan's UHQCD The First Best Selection '87~'92.

The album peaked at No. 111 on Oricon's albums chart.

Track listing 
All lyrics are written by Chisato Moritaka, except where indicated; all music is arranged by Yuichi Takahashi, except where indicated.

Charts

References

External links 
  (Chisato Moritaka)
  (Up-Front Works)
 

2015 compilation albums
Chisato Moritaka compilation albums
Japanese-language compilation albums
Zetima compilation albums